Koh-i-Noor Hardtmuth a.s. is a Czech manufacturing company of stationery products, based in České Budějovice. Having been established in 1790, it is one of the oldest stationery companies in the world.

With four factories in its country of origin (České Budějovice, Městec Králové, Broumov, and Milevsko) and one in Bulgaria, the company manufactures and commercialises a wide range of writing implements, art materials, and office products, exporting them to more than 90 countries worldwide.

History 
The company was founded in 1790 by Joseph Hardtmuth (1758–1816) of Austria. In 1802, the company patented the first pencil lead made from a combination of kaolin and graphite.

In 1848, Joseph's sons, Karl and Ludwig, took over the family business, and the production was relocated to the Bohemian town of Budweis, within the current Czech Republic. The products were given awards in many world exhibitions, including in 1855 in New York City, 1856, 1900 and 1925 in Paris, 1862 in London, 1882 in Vienna and 1905 in Milan.

At the 1889 World Fair in Paris, the Hardtmuths displayed their pencils rebranded as "Koh-I-Noor Hardtmuth". Each pencil was encased in a yellow cedar-wood barrel. The inspiration for the name was the famous Koh-i-Noor diamond (Persian for "Mountain of Light"), part of the Crown Jewels of the United Kingdom, and the largest diamond in the world at the time.

After the Second World War, Koh-i-Noor Hardtmuth was nationalized. It  became privately held in 1992. Since 2007, it has been a member of the Czech parent company KOH-I-NOOR Holding a.s. 

He was declared the Entrepreneur of the Year 2014. The previous owner was Petr Kellner. 

The company has production facilities in more than 80 countries. It is also a contract manufacturer of small injection-moulded plastic products. Koh-i-Noor was a partner in making Jiří Barta's 2009 animated feature Toys In the Attic, and its pencils appear frequently throughout the film.

Products
Koh-i-Noor's range of products include:

References

External links 

 

Manufacturing companies of Czechoslovakia
Manufacturing companies of the Czech Republic
Czech brands
Office supply companies
Pen manufacturers
Pencil brands
Fountain pen and ink manufacturers
Purveyors to the Imperial and Royal Court
1790 establishments in the Holy Roman Empire
Artists' acrylic paint brands
Oil paint brands
Watercolor brands
Art materials brands
České Budějovice